The 1892 Iowa Hawkeyes football team represented the University of Iowa during the  1892 college football season. The season involved many 'firsts' for the Hawkeyes. After going three years without a conference, Iowa joined the Western Interstate University Football Association, along with Nebraska, Missouri, and Kansas. But in another first, Edwin A. Dalton, formerly of Princeton University, was hired as Iowa's head coach. Although he was only hired for 10 days prior to the season, he is recognized as Iowa's first head coach.

On the field, the results were relatively modest. After opening the season with two victories, the Hawkeyes found themselves no match for Kansas and Missouri. Criticism was voiced, with the Iowa City Citizen claiming that Iowa lost the Missouri game because of favoritism. Despite this, Iowa ended Iowa College's three-year span of dominance over the Hawkeyes by defeating the Pioneers 18–12 just four days after the loss at Missouri. Soon thereafter, the Hawkeyes ended the season with a 10–10 tie against Nebraska.

Schedule

References

 MacCambridge, M. (2005) ESPN College Football Encyclopedia. New York: ESPN Books. .
 Lamb, D. and McGrane, B. (1964) 75 Years with the Fighting Hawkeyes. WM. C. Brown Company. 

Iowa
Iowa Hawkeyes football seasons
Iowa Hawkeyes football